HMS Starling was launched in 1805. She participated in one action and captured a privateer and a number of merchant vessels before she was sold in 1814.

Career
Although Admiralty records imply that Starling was launched in May, she was in action already in April.

Early in the morning of 24 April 1805, Captain Robert Honyman (or Honeyman), sighted twenty-six French vessels rounding Cap Gris Nez. Honyman immediately ordered the vessels of his squadron, and Starling, to intercept. After a fight of about two hours, Starling and Locust had captured seven armed schuyts in an action within pistol-shot of the shore batteries on Cap Gris Nez. The schuyts were all of 25 to 28 tons burthen, and carried in all 117 soldiers and 43 seamen under the command of officers from the 51st. Infantry Regiment. The French convoy had been bound for Ambleteuse from Dunkirk. On the British side the only casualty was one man wounded on Archer.

The seven captured schyuts were:
 Schuyt No. 52, under the command of a Sub-Lieutenant of Infantry Loriol, armed with three 24-pounders;
 Schuyt No. 48, under the command of A. Joron of the 51st the Infantry, armed with two 6-pounders, one 24-pounder and one brass howitzer;
 Schuyt No. 57, under the command of Lieutenant Loriol of 51st Infantry, armed with one 24-pounder and two 6-pounders;
 Schuyt No. 45 under the command of Sub-Lieutenant Litner of the 51st Infantry, armed with one 24-pounder, one 12-pounder and one 6-pounder;
 Schuyt No. 3. under the command of Mr. Calder, the senior commander, who left her before the British took possession of her; 
 Schuyt No. 54, under the command of Sub-Lieutenant Bragur of the 51st Infantry, armed with one 24-pounder and two 6-pounders;
 Schuyt No.43, Sub Lieutenant Billa of the 51st Infantry, armed with one 24-pounder and two 6-pounders.

The next day Archer brought in two more schuyts, No.s 44 and 58, each armed with one 24-pounder and two 12-pounders.  On 25 April 1805 Railleur towed eight of the French schuyts into the Downs. Starling, which had received a great deal of damage, followed Railleur in. Although early reports were that Starling had lost three men killed, these reports apparently were incorrect.

Lieutenant Charles Frederick Napier commissioned her in July for the Downs station. it is not clear who her commander was prior to that. He would remain her commander until she was sold in 1814.

On 23 May 1806 Starling captured the Danish vessel Diamanten.

On 22 January 1808 Lloyd's List reported that Starling had detained Vrow Magdalena and sent her into Harwich. Vrou Magdalena, Stamm, master, had been sailing from Memel to  Ostend.

 and  shared in the proceeds of the capture on 23 November of Fier Broders, J. Eynerson, master. Starling, Cruizer, Alexandrine [sic] (probably ), and Fury shared in the  proceeds of the capture, also on 23 November, of the Danish ships Vrow Sophia and Yonge Nessa. On 25 November Starling, Cruizer, Alexandrine, and  Fury captured Salskabed and St. Jorrison. Also on 25 November Starling captured Nikolai Maria.

On 6 December seven Danish vessels arrived at Yarmouth.

On 18 August Starling captured the Danish vessel Patientia. On 25 November she captured the Danish vessels Lawrence Caroline, Two Brothers, Prince Charles, Aurora, and Erudte.

She arrived at Yarmouth on 23 November with only two vessels, a storm having scattered the convoy.Starling, and Rose were in sight when on 12 October 1810  captured the Danish brig Friheden.

On 24 November Economic was lost northward of Yarmouth Pier. Economic had been sailing from the Baltic with a cargo of wheat when Starling had detained her.Starling captured the Danish vessels Fortoyelighsden and Wilhelmma on 10 and 19 May 1811.

On 13 October 1813 Starling and  assisted Hoppet'', saving her from destruction.

Fate
The Principal Officers and Commissioners of His Majesty's Navy offered the "Starling gun-brig, of 181 tons", lying at Sheerness, for sale on 29 September 1814. She sold on that day for £800.

Notes, citations, and references
Notes

Citations

References
 * 

1805 ships
Brigs of the Royal Navy